As of 1 January, 2011, Serbia no longer practises mandatory military service. Prior to this, mandatory military service lasted 6 months for men. Conscientious objectors could however opt for 9 months of civil service instead.

History
On 15 December, 2010, the National Assembly voted to suspend mandatory military service. The decision fully came into force on January 1, 2011.

From 10–17 December, 2016, sociologist Srećko Mihailović conducted a nationwide survey with a sample size of 1,200 adults on whether Serbia should return conscription, with the results being that 75% of respondents supported a return of conscription in Serbia. A  2018 poll found support for Conscription at 74%, while a 2021 poll found support at 75%.

In August 2018, President Aleksandar Vučić said the country was considering the idea of reintroducing conscription from 2020, to help improve the combat readiness of the Serbian Army.

Politics
Boško Obradović, leader of Dveri supports bringing back conscription in Serbia.

Leader of Sovereignists (Serbia) Milan Stamatović stated his support for the introduction of mandatory conscription into the army.

See also

Serbian Armed Forces

References

External links
Serbian Military official website
Serbian Ministry of Defense

Serbia
Military of Serbia
2011 disestablishments in Serbia